Charl Coetzee (born 7 September 1951) is a South African cricketer. He played in 26 first-class and 8 List A matches for Boland from 1980/81 and 1985/86.

See also
 List of Boland representative cricketers

References

External links
 

1951 births
Living people
South African cricketers
Boland cricketers
Cricketers from Cape Town